Bru or BRU may refer to:

People 
 Bru people, an ethnic group of Laos, India, Vietnam, and Thailand
 Bru language
 Bru or Reang, a tribe from northeast India
Kokborok, their Sino-Tibetan language
 Bru (surname), including a list of people with name Bru or Brú

Places 
 Brû, a commune in the Vosges department in Lorraine in northeastern France
 Brú, a farmstead and road junction in Vestur-Húnavatnssýsla county in northwestern Iceland
 Bru, Vestland, a village in Kvam municipality, Vestland county, Norway
 Bru, Sogn og Fjordane, a former municipality in the old Sogn og Fjordane, Norway
 Bru, Rogaland, an island and village in Stavanger municipality, Rogaland county, Norway
 Brù or Brue, a village on the Isle of Lewis in the Outer Hebrides, Scotland
 Brunei, IOC and UNDP code BRU
 Brussels Airport, IATA airport code BRU

Other uses
 Buller Rugby Football Union, a New Zealand rugby region
 Bus Riders Union (Los Angeles), a U.S. civil rights organization 
 Bus Riders Union (Vancouver), a Canadian non-profit organization 
 Romanian Greek Catholic Church (Romanian: Biserica Română Unită cu Roma, Greco-Catolică) (BRU)

See also 
 
 Brao (disambiguation)
 Broo (disambiguation)
 Brue (disambiguation)
 Irn-Bru, a Scottish carbonated soft drink
 Saint Brioc, or other spellings, a 5th-century Welsh holy man

Language and nationality disambiguation pages